Jason W. Brown (born May 5, 1983) is a former American football center and current farmer. He played college football at North Carolina and was drafted by the Baltimore Ravens in the fourth round of the 2005 NFL Draft.

Early years
Brown was born and raised in Henderson, North Carolina where he attended Northern Vance High School, where he was a member of the National Honor Society. He was a member of the marching band until the football coach recruited him to play football. He was a standout not only in football but also in track and field. He holds four state championships; three in discus and one for shot put.

College career
Brown did not miss a game during his career at North Carolina. He was named First-team All-ACC in 2004. Brown first saw action in his freshman year at right tackle against Florida State. Brown started his career at The University of North Carolina as a tackle, then guard. He was later moved to center, where he played the remaining three years of his college career.

Professional career

2005 NFL Draft
Along with Chris Spencer, Brown was considered one of the best centers available in the 2005 NFL Draft. He was projected as a mid-third round pick, and was eventually selected in the fourth round (124th overall) by the Baltimore Ravens.

Baltimore Ravens
Jason Brown started all 16 games at guard in the 2007 season after spending 2005 and 2006 as a backup to Ravens starter Mike Flynn. He later started all 16 games in the 2008 season as a center. He was considered the best interior offensive lineman going into free agency after the end of season.

St. Louis Rams
Brown visited the Rams in the first day of free agency February 27, 2009. The next day, he agreed to a five-year deal worth $37.5 million, including a $20 million in guaranteed money. The deal would make Brown the highest paid center in the NFL. However, on March 10, it was reported that the contract has been disapproved by the league and the two sides were working to correct the issue. The deal was finally approved by the NFL on March 12.

On March 12, 2012, Brown was released by the Rams.

Free agency
Brown became an unrestricted free agent and received a conservative one-year contract offer from the Baltimore Ravens and attended visits with the San Francisco 49ers and Carolina Panthers.

After football
Brown chose to walk away from football in 2012 at the age of 29 to become a farmer in Louisburg, North Carolina. He maintains a 1,000-acre farm called First Fruits Farm where he grows produce such as sweet potatoes and cucumbers. He donates these crops to local food pantries, having given away over 500,000 pounds of sweet potatoes and 50,000 pounds of cucumbers. Brown began learning about farming practices in 2012 by watching YouTube videos.

Brown also owns and manages a special events venue called Amazing Graze Barn, which is located on the grounds of First Fruits Farm. The barn is available for hosting weddings as well as corporate events and community gatherings.

Personal life
Brown, who is African-American, is a practicing Christian.

Jason and Tay Brown married in 2003. They have 8 children.

References

External links
North Carolina Tar Heels bio
St. Louis Rams bio
Wisdom For Life and First Fruits Farm
Amazing Graze Barn

1983 births
Living people
African-American farmers
African-American players of American football
20th-century American farmers
American football centers
American football offensive guards
Baltimore Ravens players
Farmers from North Carolina
North Carolina Tar Heels football players
People from Henderson, North Carolina
Players of American football from North Carolina
St. Louis Rams players